Alfred Morris Gelsthorpe, DSO (26 February 189222 August 1968) was an English Anglican bishop and missionary. Known popularly as 'Gelly', he was the first Bishop in the Sudan.

Early life
He was educated at The King's School, Canterbury and matriculated to Hatfield College, Durham (part of Durham University) as an arts student in October 1911. He was part of the same Hatfield cohort as Percy Fewtrell, later to become Dean of Hobart.

Military service
In September 1914, not long after the outbreak of the First World War, Gelsthorpe, who had been an active member of the Durham University Officers' Training Corps in his time as a student, enlisted initially as a regular soldier in the Artists Rifles, but then received a commission the following month and transferred to the 8th battalion of the Durham Light Infantry as second lieutenant.

He served on the Western Front in France, May 1915–September 1916, and April–September 1917; then in Mesopotamia, September 1917–January 1919. He received the Distinguished Service Order on attachment to the Machine Gun Corps and was twice mentioned in despatches. He finished the war with the rank of lieutenant colonel, despite his youthfulness.

Ordained ministry
After returning from the war, he returned to Durham University to study theology and was awarded a Licentiate of Theology (LTh). He was made a deacon in the Church of England in 1919, and was ordained as a priest in by the new Bishop of Durham, Hensley Henson, in 1920.

Gelsthorpe began his ecclesiastical career with a curacy at  St Gabriel’s, Sunderland. In 1923 he became a CMS Missionary and moved to Awka in Colonial Nigeria. A popular minister in Sunderland, before his departure he received the gift of a watch from the committee of Sunderland Rugby Club.

He was Principal of the Staff Training College for African Agents in Awka from 1926 to 1933; Assistant Bishop to the Bishop on the Niger from 1933 to 1938, and Assistant Bishop  to the Bishop of Egypt from 1938 to 1945. He was Bishop in the Sudan from 1945 to 1952; Rector of Bingham, Nottinghamshire from November 1952 to 1963, and an Assistant Bishop of Southwell from November 1952 'til death.

Personal
Gelsthorpe claimed to have a 'special interest' in all athletics. He was particularly active in rugby and competed for Blackheath Rugby Club as a youth, later on representing Durham County during his university studies.

In 1949 he married Dr Elfrida Whidborne of the Church Missionary Society Hospital in Omdurman.

Notes

1892 births
People educated at The King's School, Canterbury
Artists' Rifles officers
Companions of the Distinguished Service Order
Anglican bishops in Sudan
1968 deaths
Alumni of Hatfield College, Durham
Durham Light Infantry officers
Durham County RFU players
Blackheath F.C. players